The Quaker Hill Historic District  is a national historic district located at Wilmington, New Castle County, Delaware. It encompasses 151 contributing buildings in a residential neighborhood west of the central business district of Wilmington. The district includes 19th-century residential structures of all classes, along with several 19th-and 20th-century commercial structures.  The predominant structures are three-story rowhouse dwellings in a variety of popular styles including Second Empire, Italianate, and Gothic Revival.  Notable non-residential buildings include the Quaker Meetinghouse and Cemetery, St. Peter's Cathedral and Rectory (1816), Union Methodist Church, and New Mount Bethel Baptist Church 

It was added to the National Register of Historic Places in 1979, with a boundary increase in 1985.

Gallery

References

External links
Quaker Hill Historic Preservation - Architecture

Gothic Revival architecture in Delaware
Italianate architecture in Delaware
Second Empire architecture in Delaware
Historic districts in Wilmington, Delaware
Historic districts on the National Register of Historic Places in Delaware
National Register of Historic Places in Wilmington, Delaware